The 2013 UCLA Bruins baseball team represented the University of California, Los Angeles in the 2013 NCAA Division I baseball season.  The Bruins competed in the Pac-12 Conference, and played their home games in Jackie Robinson Stadium.  John Savage served as head coach for his 9th season.  The Bruins swept through the NCAA Tournament's Los Angeles Regional, Fullerton Super Regional, and College World Series bracket to reach the final against Mississippi State, their second appearance in four years. The Bruins swept the Bulldogs in a best of three series to win their first NCAA National Championship in baseball, while going a perfect 10–0 in the postseason; the third consecutive NCAA Division I baseball team to sweep the postseason en route to the championship, and also the last to do so.

Roster

Schedule

! style="" | Regular Season
|- valign="top" 

|- bgcolor="#ffbbb"
| Feb 15 ||  || Jackie Robinson Stadium • Los Angeles, CA || 2–6 (10) || Kray (1–0) || Poteet (0–1) || None || 841 || 0–1 ||
|- bgcolor="#ccffcc"
| Feb 16 || Minnesota || Jackie Robinson Stadium • Los Angeles, CA || 14–0 || Vander Tuig (1–0) || Meyer (0–1) || None || 818 || 1–1 ||
|- bgcolor="#ccffcc"
| Feb 17 || Minnesota || Jackie Robinson Stadium • Los Angeles, CA || 14–1 || Watson (1–0) || Jess (0–1) || None || 847 || 2–1 ||
|- bgcolor="#ccffcc"
| Feb 22 || @  || Baylor Ballpark • Waco, TX || 4–3 || Plutko (1–0) || Garner (0–2) || Kaprielian (1) || 2,715 || 3–1 ||
|- bgcolor="#ffbbb"
| Feb 23 || @ Baylor || Baylor Ballpark • Waco, TX || 0–5 || Newman (1–0) || Vander Tuig (1–1) || Smith (2) || 3,085 || 3–2 ||
|- bgcolor="#ccffcc"
| Feb 24 || @ Baylor || Baylor Ballpark • Waco, TX || 5–4 || Berg (1–0) || Michalec (0–1) || Kaprielian (2) || 2,667 || 4–2 ||
|- bgcolor="#ccffcc"
| Feb 26 || @  || Caesar Uyesaka Stadium • Santa Barbara, CA || 12–3 || Poteet (1–1) || Mahle (0–1) || None || 425 || 5–2 ||
|-

|- bgcolor="#ccffcc"
| Mar 1 ||  || Jackie Robinson Stadium • Los Angeles, CA || 6–3 || Plutko (2–0) || Henn (1–2) || Berg (1) || 515 || 6–2 ||
|- bgcolor="#ccffcc"
| Mar 2 || Wright State || Jackie Robinson Stadium • Los Angeles, CA || 4–2 || Vander Tuig (2–1) || Braun (0–2) || Berg (2) || 562 || 7–2 ||
|- bgcolor="#ccffcc"
| Mar 3 || Wright State || Jackie Robinson Stadium • Los Angeles, CA || 10–2 || Watson (2–0) || Sexton (1–2) || None || 609 || 8–2 ||
|- bgcolor="#ccffcc"
| Mar 5 || @  || Blair Field • Long Beach, CA || 3–2 || Deeter (1–0) || Frye (0–1) || Berg (3) || 1,322 || 9–2 ||
|- bgcolor="#ccffcc"
| Mar 8 || #25  || Jackie Robinson Stadium • Los Angeles, CA || 2–1 (10) || Berg (2–0) || McCarty (2–2) || None || 620 || 10–2 ||
|- bgcolor="#ffbbb"
| Mar 9 || #10  || Jackie Robinson Stadium • Los Angeles, CA || 0–4 || Gray (3–1) || Vander Tuig (2–2) || None || 866 || 10–3 ||
|- bgcolor="#ccffcc"
| Mar 10 ||  || Jackie Robinson Stadium • Los Angeles, CA || 6–1 || Watson (3–0) || Adler (0–2) || None || 2,157 || 11–3 ||
|- bgcolor="#ccffcc"
| Mar 12 || @  || Matador Field • Northridge, CA || 5–4 || Weiss (1–0) || Maltese (0–1) || Berg (4) || 653 || 12–3 ||
|- bgcolor="#ccffcc"
| Mar 16 ||  || Jackie Robinson Stadium • Los Angeles, CA || 3–2 (15) || Ehret (1–0) || Kim (0–1) || None || 428 || 13–3 || 1–0
|- bgcolor="#ccffcc"
| Mar 16 || Washington || Jackie Robinson Stadium • Los Angeles, CA || 5–0 || Vander Tuig (3–2) || Voth (2–3) || None || 503 || 14–3 || 2–0
|- bgcolor="#ccffcc"
| Mar 17 || Washington || Jackie Robinson Stadium • Los Angeles, CA || 3–0 || Watson (4–0) || Fisher (0–1) || Berg (5) || 613 || 15–3 || 3–0
|- bgcolor="#ffbbb"
| Mar 22 || #27  || Jackie Robinson Stadium • Los Angeles, CA || 1–5 || Mason (4–0) || Plutko (2–1) || None || 525 || 15–4 || 3–1
|- bgcolor="#ccffcc"
| Mar 23 || #27 California || Jackie Robinson Stadium • Los Angeles, CA || 8–3 || Vander Tuig (4–2) || Jones (1–2) || None || 740 || 16–4 || 4–1
|- bgcolor="#ccffcc"
| Mar 24 || #27 California || Jackie Robinson Stadium • Los Angeles, CA || 10–2 || Watson (5–0) || Nelson (0–1) || None || 974 || 17–4 || 5–1
|- bgcolor="#ffbbb"
| Mar 28 || @  || Packard Stadium • Tempe, AZ || 1–4 || Williams (4–2) || Plutko (2–2) || Burr (4) || 3,501 || 17–5 || 5–2
|- bgcolor="#ffbbb"
| Mar 29 || @ Arizona State || Packard Stadium • Tempe, AZ || 4–7 || Kellogg (6–0) || Poteet (1–2) || Burr (5) || 3,561 || 17–6 || 5–3
|- bgcolor="#ccffcc"
| Mar 30 || @ Arizona State || Packard Stadium • Tempe, AZ || 12–10 (10) || Berg (3–0) || Mebostad (0–1) || None || 2,870 || 18–6 || 6–3
|-

|- bgcolor="#ffbbb"
| Apr 2 || #5 Cal State Fullerton || Jackie Robinson Stadium • Los Angeles, CA || 6–9 || Peitzmeier (2–0) || Poteet (1–3) || Lorenzen (9) || 723 || 18–7 || 
|- bgcolor="#ccffcc"
| Apr 5 || #6 Oregon State || Jackie Robinson Stadium • Los Angeles, CA || 3–2 || Plutko (3–2) || Boyd (6–1) || Berg (6) || 847 || 19–7 || 7–3
|- bgcolor="#ffbbb"
| Apr 6 || #6 Oregon State || Jackie Robinson Stadium • Los Angeles, CA || 0–5 || Moore (6–1) || Vander Tuig (4–3) || None || 1,001 || 19–8 || 7–4
|- bgcolor="#ffbbb"
| Apr 7 || #6 Oregon State || Jackie Robinson Stadium • Los Angeles, CA || 2–5 || Wetzler (1–1) || Watson (5–1) || Schultz (7) || 1,057 || 19–9 || 7–5
|- bgcolor="#ccffcc"
| Apr 9 ||  || Jackie Robinson Stadium • Los Angeles, CA || 5–1 || Poteet (2–3) || Squier (0–5) || None || 465 || 20–9 || 
|- bgcolor="#ccffcc"
| Apr 12 ||  || Jackie Robinson Stadium • Los Angeles, CA || 2–0 || Plutko (4–2) || Welmon (5–2) || Berg (7) || 510 || 21–9 ||
|- bgcolor="#ccffcc"
| Apr 13 || Loyola Marymount || Jackie Robinson Stadium • Los Angeles, CA || 3–1 || Vender Tuig (5–3) || Griffin (3–4) || Berg (8) || 592 || 22–9 ||
|- bgcolor="#ffbbb"
| Apr 14 || Loyola Marymount || Jackie Robinson Stadium • Los Angeles, CA || 1–4 || McGrath (2–1) || Watson (5–2) || Dahlson (4) || 714 || 22–10 || 
|- bgcolor="#ccffcc"
| Apr 16 || @  || Cicerone Field • Irvine, CA || 6–4 (12) || Berg (4–0) || Parmenter (1–2) || None || 1,041 || 23–10 || 
|- bgcolor="#ccffcc"
| Apr 19 || @ #7  || PK Park • Eugene, OR || 1–0 || Plutko (5–2) || Thorpe (5–4) || Berg (9) || 1,917 || 24–10 || 8–5
|- bgcolor="#ccffcc"
| Apr 20 || @ #7 Oregon || PK Park • Eugene, OR || 1–0 || Vander Tuig (6–3) || Irvin (7–2) || Berg (10) || 3,181 || 25–10 || 9–5
|- bgcolor="#ffbbb"
| Apr 21 || @ #7 Oregon || PK Park • Eugene, OR || 3–5 || Reed (5–3) || Watson (5–3) || Sherfy (13) || 2,137 || 25–11 || 9–6
|- bgcolor="#ffbbb"
| Apr 23 ||  || Jackie Robinson Stadium • Los Angeles, CA || 1–11 || Sabo (2–2) || Poteet (2–4) || None || 459 || 25–12 || 
|- bgcolor="#ccffcc"
| Apr 26 || @  || Bailey–Brayton Field • Pullman, WA || 7–6 (11) || Berg (5–0) || Monda (2–1) || None || 873 || 26–12 || 10–6
|- bgcolor="#ccffcc"
| Apr 27 || @ Washington State || Bailey–Brayton Field • Pullman, WA || 10–1 || Vander Tuig (7–3) || Chelborad (3–7) || None || 1,117 || 27–12 || 11–6
|- bgcolor="#ffbbb"
| Apr 28 || @ Washington State || Bailey–Brayton Field • Pullman, WA || 3–4 || Leckenby (1–2) || Weiss (1–1) || Monda (1) || 781 || 27–13 || 11–7
|- bgcolor="#ccffcc"
| Apr 30 || UC Irvine || Jackie Robinson Stadium • Los Angeles, CA || 8–1 || Poteet (3–4) || Brock (1–1) || None || 459 || 28–13 || 
|-

|- bgcolor="#ccffcc"
| May 3 ||  || Jackie Robinson Stadium • Los Angeles, CA || 5–2 || Plutko (6–2) || Watrous (3–3) || Berg (11) || 613 || 29–13 || 12–7
|- bgcolor="#ccffcc"
| May 4 || Utah || Jackie Robinson Stadium • Los Angeles, CA || 5–4 || Vander Tuig (8–3) || Carroll (3–6) || Berg (12) || 733 || 30–13 || 13–7
|- bgcolor="#ccffcc"
| May 5 || Utah || Jackie Robinson Stadium • Los Angeles, CA || 4–3 || Berg (6–0) || Green (0–1) || None || 872 || 31–13 || 14–7
|- bgcolor="#ffbbb"
| May 7 ||  || Jackie Robinson Stadium • Los Angeles, CA || 1–4 || Sandoval (2–0) || Poteet (3–5) || Gossen-Brown (9) || 489 || 31–14 || 
|- bgcolor="#ccffcc"
| May 10 || Arizona || Jackie Robinson Stadium • Los Angeles, CA || 10–2 || Plutko (7–2) || Farris (4–5) || None || 844 || 32–14 || 15–7
|- bgcolor="#ccffcc"
| May 11 || Arizona || Jackie Robinson Stadium • Los Angeles, CA || 7–1 || Vander Tuig (9–3) || Wade (4–6) || Berg (13) || 1,016 || 33–14 || 16–7
|- bgcolor="#ccffcc"
| May 12 || Arizona || Jackie Robinson Stadium • Los Angeles, CA || 12–5 || Deeter (2–0) || Crawford (5–2) || None || 809 || 34–14 || 17–7
|- bgcolor="#ffbbb"
| May 14 || @ #5 Cal State Fullerton || Goodwin Field • Fullerton, CA || 2–5 || Birosak (1–0) || Poteet (3–6) || Lorenzen (16) || 2,738 || 34–15 || 
|- bgcolor="#ccffcc"
| May 17 || @  || Dedeaux Field • Los Angeles, CA || 2–1 || Weiss (2–1) || Wheatley (1–3) || Berg (14) || 796 || 35–15 || 18–7
|- bgcolor="#ccffcc"
| May 18 || @ Southern California || Dedeaux Field • Los Angeles, CA || 7–6 || Vander Tuig (10–3) || Nootbaar (2–5) || Berg (15) || 871 || 36–15 || 19–7
|- bgcolor="#ccffcc"
| May 19 || @ Southern California || Dedeaux Field • Los Angeles, CA || 5–2 || Watson (6–3) || Twomey (2–7) || Berg (16) || 1,106 || 37–15 || 20–7
|- bgcolor="#ccffcc"
| May 21 ||  || Jackie Robinson Stadium • Los Angeles, CA || 2–1 || Poteet (4–6) || Jacome (5–4) || Berg (17) || 653 || 38–15 || 
|- bgcolor="#ffbbb"
| May 24 || @  || Klein Field at Sunken Diamond • Stanford, CA || 1–2 || Appel (10–4) || Plutko (7–3) || Hughes (4) || 2,121 || 38–16 || 20–8
|- bgcolor="#ffbbb"
| May 25 || @ Stanford || Klein Field at Sunken Diamond • Stanford, CA || 3–7 || James (3–3) || Vander Tuig (10–4) || Lindquist (5) || 1,792 || 38–17 || 20–9
|- bgcolor="#ccffcc"
| May 26 || @ Stanford || Klein Field at Sunken Diamond • Stanford, CA || 6–4 || Watson (7–3) || McArdle (3–3) || Berg (18) || 2,679 || 39–17 || 21–9
|-

|-
! style="" | Post-Season
|-

|- bgcolor="#ccffcc"
| May 31 || (4)  ||Jackie Robinson Stadium • Los Angeles, CA  || 5–3 || Plutko (8–3)  || Ryan Doran (8–4) || Berg (19) || 1,690 || 40–17 ||1–0
|- bgcolor="#ccffcc"
| June 1 || (2)  || Jackie Robinson Stadium • Los Angeles, CA  || 6–4 || Vander Tuig (11–4)  || Reed Reilly (2–4)  || Berg (20)  || 1,749  || 41–17 ||2–0
|- bgcolor="#ccffcc"
| June 1|| (3)  || Jackie Robinson Stadium • Los Angeles, CA  || 6–0 || Watson (8–3)  || Max Homick (5–2)  || None || 1,220 || 42–17 ||3–0
|-

|- bgcolor="#ccffcc"
| June 6 || #5 Cal State Fullerton || Goodwin Field • Fullerton, CA || 5–3 (10) || Berg (7–0) || J. D. Davis (1–2)  || None ||3,244  ||43–17 ||4–0
|- bgcolor="#ccffcc"
| June 7 || #5 Cal State Fullerton  || Goodwin Field • Fullerton, CA || 3–0 || Vander Tuig (12–4) || Thomas Eshelman (12–3) || Berg (21)  ||3,303 || 44–17||5–0
|-

|- bgcolor="#ccffcc"
| June 16 || LSU || TD Ameritrade Park • Omaha, NE || 2–1 || Plutko (9–3) || Nola (12–1) || Berg (22) || 26,344 || 45–17 || 1–0
|- bgcolor="#ccffcc"
| June 18 || NC State || TD Ameritrade Park • Omaha, NE || 2–1 || Vander Tuig (13–4) || Jernigan (1–1) || Berg (23) || 25,543 || 46–17 || 2–0
|- bgcolor="#ccffcc"
| June 21 || #1 North Carolina || TD Ameritrade Park • Omaha, NE || 4–1 || Watson (9–3) || Emanuel (11–5) || None || 25,947 || 47–17 || 3–0
|- bgcolor="#ccffcc"
| June 24 || Mississippi State || TD Ameritrade Park • Omaha, NE || 3–1 || Plutko (10–3)  || Fitts (0–1) || Berg (24) || 25,690 || 48–17 || 4–0
|- bgcolor="#ccffcc"
| June 25 || Mississippi State || TD Ameritrade Park • Omaha, NE || 8–0 || Vander Tuig (14–4)  || Pollorena (6–4)|| None || 27,127 || 49–17 || 5–0
|-

Ranking movements

UCLA Bruins in the 2013 MLB Draft
The following members of the UCLA Bruins baseball program were drafted in the 2013 Major League Baseball Draft.

Notes
 UCLA is making a back-to-back trip to the College World Series, the third time in the last four years
 UCLA defeated No. 5 nationally seeded Cal State Fullerton (5–3, 3–0) in the Fullerton Super Regional
 The Bruins defeated No. 4 seeded LSU (2–1), NC State (2–1) and No. 1 seeded North Carolina (4–1) to advance to the Championship series; UCLA is the only undefeated team (8–0) in the tournament
 The pitching orders have been Adam Plutko, Nick Vander Tuig, Grant Watson and the relievers are James Kaprielian, Zack Weiss, and David Berg (this order)
 David Berg is the Pac-12 Conference Baseball Pitcher of the Year and the NCBWA Stopper of the Year
 Shortstop Pat Valaika is the Pac-12 Conference Defensive Player of the Year
 David Berg and Pat Valaika are named to the American Baseball Coaches Association (ABCA) All-West Region team
 David Berg set a new NCAA record with his 24th save of the year on June 24, 2013
 Berg made his 51st appearance of the season, becoming the first pitcher in NCAA history to record 50 or more appearances in multiple seasons
 The Bruins won the school's 109th NCAA National Championship
 Adam Plutko was named the College World Series Most Outstanding Player
 All-Tournament Team from UCLA: Pat Valaika (SS), Eric Filia (OF), Adam Plutko (P), Nick Vander Tuig (P)
 The championship banner was unveiled at the Championship Celebration at Jackie Robinson Stadium on June 27, 2013
 Head coach John Savage is named the National Coach of the Year by Collegiate Baseball Newspaper and Baseball America, and the ABCA West Region Coach of the Year

References

Ucla Bruins
UCLA Bruins baseball seasons
College World Series seasons
NCAA Division I Baseball Championship seasons
2013 NCAA Division I baseball tournament participants
UCLA